Mammut (Italian for Mammoth) is a Mine Train steel roller coaster from the company Vekoma located in Gardaland, Italy. It is the third roller coaster of this company in the park and is the largest coaster for families at the park.

Mammut was inaugurated in 2008. The 5,000 m2 large area, where this attraction was built, was previously occupied by a complex of paid games.

Gallery

External links
 Official Website

Roller coasters in Italy
Roller coasters introduced in 2008
Gardaland rides